The Samsung Galaxy A6 and Samsung Galaxy A6+ are mid range Android smartphones produced by Samsung Electronics. They were announced on 2 May 2018, first released in Europe, Asia, and Latin America the same month, then released in South Korea, Africa, and China. The Samsung Galaxy A6+ is rebranded in South Korea as Galaxy Jean & in China as Galaxy A9 Star lite.

Specifications

Hardware
The Samsung Galaxy A6 has a 5.6" Super AMOLED Infinity Display with a resolution of 1,480x720. It's powered by the octa-core 1.6 GHz Samsung Exynos 7870 processor. The phone also features a 3,000 mAh battery which does not support fast charging.

The Samsung Galaxy A6+ is a bigger variant of the normal A6 and has a Super AMOLED Infinity Display with a resolution of 2,220 x 1,080 pixels. It has a 16MP main camera and a 5MP depth camera on the rear as well as a 24MP camera on the front. On board is an octa-core 1.8 GHz Qualcomm Snapdragon 450 processor. The phone also has a 3,500 mAh battery which like the A6 does not support fast charging.

Camera
The Samsung Galaxy A6 has a 16MP  (f1.7) camera on both the rear and front (f1.9).

The main camera on the Samsung Galaxy A6+ is 24 MPs (f.1.7) which is also accompanied by a 5MP (f.1.9) camera. On the front is a 16 MP (f.1.7) camera.

Software
Both the Galaxy A6 and A6+ come with Android Oreo and Samsung Experience 9.5. Samsung then provided an update to Android Pie with Samsung's One UI.

Critical reception 
On May 1, 2018 CNET spoke positively about the cameras on the phone. CNET described Galaxy A6 and Galaxy A6+ as for users who like Samsung's designs but aren't all about the cost that comes with the  Galaxy S9+.

References 

Android (operating system) devices
Samsung Galaxy
Samsung smartphones
Mobile phones introduced in 2018
Mobile phones with multiple rear cameras
Discontinued smartphones